An All-American team is an honorary sports team composed of the best amateur players of a specific season for each team position—who in turn are given the honorific "All-America" and typically referred to as "All-American athletes", or simply "All-Americans". Although the honorees generally do not compete together as a unit, the term is used in U.S. team sports to refer to players who are selected by members of the national media.  Walter Camp selected the first All-America team in the early days of American football in 1889.  The 2019 NCAA Men's Soccer All-Americans are honorary lists that include All-American selections from the United Soccer Coaches (USC), Top Drawer Soccer (TDS), Soccer America (TSN), and College Soccer News for the 2019 NCAA Division I men's soccer season. All selectors choose at least a first, second, and third 11-man team. 

Although the aforementioned lists are used to determine consensus honors, there are numerous other All-American lists. The three finalists for the Hermann Trophy are described as Hermann All-Americans. The ten finalists for the Senior CLASS Award are described as Senior All-Americans.  Other All-American lists include those determined by Hero Sports and many others. The scholar-athletes selected by College Sports Information Directors of America (CoSIDA) are termed Academic All-Americans.

Individual All-America teams

By player 
This list is of players who were named first-team All-Americans by each respective publication.

 Key

List

By team

Academic All-Americans 
CoSIDA names three Academic All-American teams for the 2019 season.

Senior All-Americans 
The 10 finalists for the Senior CLASS Award are considered Senior All-Americans.

Freshman All-Americans

References 

All-Americans
NCAA Men's Soccer All-Americans